Dolby Vision is a set of technologies developed by Dolby Laboratories for high dynamic range (HDR) video. It covers content creation, distribution, and playback. It includes dynamic metadata that are used to adjust and optimize each frame of the HDR video to the consumer display's capabilities in a way based on the content creator's intents.

Dolby Vision was introduced in 2014, making it the first available HDR format. HDR10+ is a competitor HDR format that also uses dynamic metadata.

Dolby Vision IQ is an update designed to optimize Dolby Vision content according to the ambient light.

Dolby Cinema uses Dolby Vision too, though because of the use of 2.6 gamma and thus 48 nits in SDR cinemas, the 108 nits used in Dolby Cinema is already HDR.

The first open source player to support profile 5 was mpv.

Description 
Dolby Vision allows for a maximum resolution of 8K, up to 12-bit color depth, maximum peak brightness of 10,000 nits. However, according to the Dolby Vision white paper, as of 2018 professional reference monitors, such as the Dolby Vision HDR reference monitor, are currently limited to 4,000 nits of peak brightness.

Dolby Vision includes the PQ transfer function, a wide-gamut color space (ITU-R Rec. BT.2020 in YCBCR or IPTPQc2), up to 8K resolution, and for some profiles (FEL) up to 12-bit. It can encode mastering display colorimetry information using static metadata (SMPTE ST 2086) and also provide dynamic metadata (SMPTE ST 2094-10, Dolby format) for each scene or frame. This dynamic metadata or Dynamic HDR allows adjusting of brightness and contrast (in reality, the tone curve) on the scene by scene or even frame by frame basis as and when required and adjusts it many times during the video/movie. It is considered to be future-proof.

Dolby Vision includes dynamic metadata that are used to adjust the brightness, color and sharpness of each frame of the video to match the display color volume (i.e. the maximum and minimum brightness capability and the color gamut). It allows for the creative intents to be preserved on all Dolby Vision compatible displays. Dolby Vision and HDR10+ do not use the same dynamic metadata.

Technical details 
The Dolby Vision format is capable of representing videos with a peak brightness up to 10,000 cd/m2 and a color gamut up to Rec. 2020. Current displays cannot reproduce the full Dolby Vision brightness and gamut capability. There are no brightness and color gamut capability requirements for consumer displays. When the consumer display has lower color volume than the mastering display, the content is adjusted to the consumer display capability based on the dynamic metadata.

Dolby Vision mastering display require:

 EOTF: PQ 
 Peak brightness: at least 1,000 cd/m2
 Black level: at most 0.005 cd/m2
 Contrast ratio: at least 200,000:1
 Color gamut: at least 99% of P3

Metadata 
Dolby Vision metadata include:

 L0 (static): Mastering and target display characteristics
 L1 (dynamic): Automatically generated
 L2 trims (dynamic): Manually generated per frame or per scene
 L3 trims (dynamic): Manually generated per frame or per scene (since CMv4.0)
 L8 trims (dynamic): Manually generated per frame or per scene (since CMv4.0) (equivalent of L2 trims)
 L5: Timeline aspect ratio description
 L6 (static and optional): MaxCLL and MaxFALL (required for HDR10)
 L9 (dynamic): Mastering display color primaries (since CMv4.0)
Dolby Vision 4.0 introduces new secondary trims for hue and saturation adjustment.

Profiles

Dual layer 
Some Dolby Vision profiles are dual layer (for example: the profile 7 used for Ultra HD Blu-ray). The base layer (BL) and the enhancement layer (EL) are combined to produce a 12-bit video stream.

The enhancement layer can be full enhancement layer (FEL) or minimum enhancement layer (MEL).

File formats 

 ISO Base Media File Format
MP4
DECE
Common File Format (CFF)
Protected Interoperable File Format (PIFF)
 HTTP Live Streaming
 MPEG-2 Transport Stream Format
 MPEG-DASH
 MKV

License 
Dolby Vision is a proprietary solution by Dolby. 

In 2021, compatible color grading systems can create Dolby Vision automatic metadata with no additional cost for content creators. A $2,500 annual license is required to activate the trims allowing content creators to manually adjust the video. OEM and manufacturer of a grading, mastering, editorial, or other professional application or device need to apply for a license.

Dolby SVP of Business Giles Baker has stated that the royalty cost for Dolby Vision is less than $3 per TV.

Libplacebo (as part of VideoLAN project) implemented support for Dolby Vision profile 5's IPTPQc2 color space, MMR and reshaping, yet no support of dynamic metadata and NLQ yet.

Adoption

Hardware 

 TV:
LG
Panasonic
Philips
Sony
TCL
Toshiba
Vizio
VU

 Monitors:
ASUS

Smartphones:
Display:
LG G6
iPhone 8/8 Plus, X, XS/XS Max, XR, 11, 11 Pro/11 Pro Max, SE (2nd generation), 12/12 mini, 12 Pro/12 Pro Max and 13/13 mini,  13 Pro/13 Pro Max.
Xiaomi: Mi 11 Ultra, Mi 11 Pro
Camera:
iPhone 12/12 mini, 12 Pro/12 Pro Max, iPhone 13/13 mini, 13 Pro/13 Pro Max and iPhone 14/14 Plus, 14 Pro/14 Pro Max
Xiaomi 12S Ultra
Xiaomi MIX Fold 2
Xiaomi 13 
Xiaomi 13 Pro
Vivo X90 Pro+
Gaming consoles:
Xbox One X/S: Streaming apps only.
Xbox Series X/S: Streaming apps and gaming.

Content distribution 

 Ultra HD Blu-ray
 Streaming services
Vimeo: Only for Apple devices
Netflix
Disney+
Hulu
HBO Max

Software 

 Color grading:
 Autodesk Lustre
 Autodesk Flame 2021
 Blackmagic Design Davinci Resolve
 Digital Vision Nucoda
 Filmlight Baselight
 Grass Valley RIO
 SGO Mistika
 Encoder:
 x265: Profile 5, profile 8.1 and profile 8.2 (since version 3.0)
Media player:
Exoplayer (open source)
Shaka Player (device dependent, open source)

References

Dolby Laboratories
High dynamic range
American brands
American inventions 
Audiovisual introductions in 2014
Ultra-high-definition television